Muppu is seen as a major achievement in Siddha medicine. It is a combination of three salt-like substances. Muppu has a great purpose in medicine and alchemy. Siddhars used it as a catalyst of medicine. Traditional Siddha practitioners found that when the muppu was added to medicine it acted quickly and no patthiyam which is important in Siddha medicine. Scientific research work was done by Dr. C . Eleza BSMS MD PHD, of Tamil Nadu India whose book shows various facts.
 “Pooneeru“ is one of the three salts according to Traditional siddha literature . The result of the chemical analysis of Khadi extracts showed that Khadi prepared from the Karunguruvai paddy grains (rice) was the best base solvent for ion exchange in the preparation of muppu than Samba Khadi. The analysis of the composition of these two types of Karunguruvai Khadi show that it is a good solvent for the elimination of heavy metals and for the enrichment of elements in Pooneeru powder (muppu), the chuurnam of Siddha drugs. These characteristics enhance the therapeutic potential and safety of the drugs for healing chronic diseases.

Siddha medicine